Alejandro Kirk (born November 6, 1998) is a Mexican professional baseball catcher for the Toronto Blue Jays of Major League Baseball (MLB).

Early life
Kirk began playing baseball at three years of age, and grew up a fan of Albert Pujols and the St. Louis Cardinals. His Little League team was coached by his father. He has an elder brother, Juan Manuel Jr., and a younger brother, Andres.

Professional career
Kirk was discovered by Toronto Blue Jays scout Dean Decillis at a showcase held by the Toros de Tijuana of the Mexican League. He was signed by the team on September 24, 2016, and received a $7,500 signing bonus, with the Toros receiving $22,500 to release him. He made his professional debut with the Rookie-level Gulf Coast League Blue Jays in 2017, appearing in one game. He played the entire 2018 season with the Rookie Advanced Bluefield Blue Jays, and recorded a .354 batting average with 10 home runs and 57 runs batted in (RBI) in 58 games. Kirk also walked more than he struck out, finishing the season with 33 and 21 respectively. He was promoted to the Class-A Lansing Lugnuts to begin the 2019 season, and later earned a promotion to the Advanced-A Dunedin Blue Jays, where he finished the year. In 92 total games played, Kirk hit .290 with seven home runs, 44 RBI, and 56 walks against just 39 strikeouts. On February 7, 2020, the Blue Jays invited Kirk to spring training.

Kirk was expected to begin the 2020 minor league season with the Double-A New Hampshire Fisher Cats, however the season was delayed and ultimately cancelled by the COVID-19 pandemic. He was added to the team's taxi squad on September 1, 2020. On September 11, Kirk was called up by the Blue Jays. He made his debut the following night, and recorded his first MLB hit. On September 21, 2020, he recorded four hits and his first home run in the majors. He also became the first catcher 21 or younger with four hits in a game since Joe Mauer in 2004. Overall with the 2020 Blue Jays, Kirk batted .375 with one home run and three RBI in nine games.

On May 8, 2021, Kirk was placed on the 60-day injured list with a left hip flexor injury. On July 20, Kirk was activated off of the injured list after missing over two months of action. Overall for the 2021 season, Kirk batted .242 with eight home runs and 24 RBIs in 60 games.

On July 8, 2022, Kirk was named an All-Star for the first time in his career, along with teammate Vladimir Guerrero Jr. Kirk finished the 2022 season batting .285 with 14 home runs and 63 RBI. On November 10, he was announced as the winner of the Silver Slugger award at catcher for the American League.

References

External links

1998 births
Living people
American League All-Stars
Bluefield Blue Jays players
Buffalo Bisons (minor league) players
Dunedin Blue Jays players
Gulf Coast Blue Jays players
Lansing Lugnuts players
Major League Baseball catchers
Major League Baseball players from Mexico
Mexican expatriate baseball players in Canada
Mexican expatriate baseball players in the United States
Silver Slugger Award winners
Sportspeople from Tijuana
Toronto Blue Jays players